Xinyi Yuan (born 1981) is a Chinese mathematician who is currently a professor of mathematics at Peking University working in number theory, arithmetic geometry, and automorphic forms. In particular, his work focuses on arithmetic intersection theory, algebraic dynamics, Diophantine equations and special values of L-functions.

Education
Yuan is from Macheng, Huanggang, Hubei province, and graduated from Huanggang Middle School in 2000. That year, he received a gold medal at the International Mathematical Olympiad while representing China. Yuan obtained his A.B. in mathematics from Peking University in 2003 and his Ph.D. in mathematics from the Columbia University in 2008 under the direction of Shou-Wu Zhang. His article "Big Line Bundles over Arithmetic Varieties," published in Inventiones Mathematicae, demonstrates a natural sufficient condition for when the orbit under the absolute Galois group is equidistributed.

Career
He spent time at the Institute for Advanced Study, Princeton University, and Harvard University before joining the Berkeley faculty in 2012.

Yuan was appointed a Clay Research Fellow for a three-year term from 2008 to 2013. Together with a number of other collaborators, Yuan was profiled in Quanta Magazine and Business Insider for, among other things, his research on L-functions.

Yuan left UC Berkeley to become a full professor at Peking University in 2020.

Research
Together with Shou-Wu Zhang, Yuan proved the averaged Colmez conjecture which was later shown to imply the André–Oort conjecture for Siegel modular varieties by Jacob Tsimerman.

Publications (selected) 
 (with Tong Zhang) "Effective Bound of Linear Series on Arithmetic Surfaces", Duke Mathematical Journal 162 (2013), no. 10, 1723–1770.
 "On Volumes of Arithmetic Line Bundles", Compositio Mathematica 145 (2009), 1447–1464.
 "Big Line Bundles over Arithmetic Varieties", Inventiones mathematicae 173 (2008), no. 3, 603–649.
 (with Tong Zhang) "Relative Noether inequality on fibered surfaces", Advances in Mathematics 259 (2014), 89–115.
 (with Shou-Wu Zhang) "The arithmetic Hodge index theorem for adelic line bundles", Mathematische Annalen (2016), 1–49.
 (with Wei Zhang, Shou-Wu Zhang) "The Gross–Kohnen–Zagier theorem over totally real fields", Compositio Mathematica 145 (2009), no. 5, 1147–1162.
 (with Wei Zhang, Shou-Wu Zhang) "The Gross–Zagier formula on Shimura curves", Annals of Mathematics Studies vol. 184, Princeton University Press, 2012.
 (with Wei Zhang, Shou-Wu Zhang) "Triple product L-series and Gross–Kudla–Schoen cycles", preprint.

References

Mathematicians from Hubei
Living people
University of California, Berkeley faculty
Institute for Advanced Study visiting scholars
Peking University alumni
University of California, Berkeley alumni
International Mathematical Olympiad participants
People from Huanggang
Educators from Hubei
Arithmetic geometers
1981 births